Tomislav Prosen (born 24 December 1943 in Sisak) is a retired Yugoslav football player and manager. He is considered one of the greatest players who played for Slovenian club NK Maribor, where he spent much of his career. Prosen is Maribor's second all-time most capped player with 391 appearances between 1962 and 1979. He played in the 1967–68 Mitropa Cup final for Red Star Belgrade as a guest player.

References

1943 births
Living people
People from Sisak
Yugoslav footballers
Association football midfielders
NK Maribor players
Yugoslav First League players
Yugoslav Second League players
Yugoslav expatriate footballers
NEC Nijmegen players
Eredivisie players
NK Olimpija Ljubljana (1945–2005) players
Red Star Belgrade footballers
Yugoslav football managers
NK Maribor managers